Quadrangle or The Quadrangle may refer to:

Architecture
Quadrangle (architecture), a courtyard surrounded by a building or several buildings, often at a college

Various specific quadrangles, often called "the quad" or "the quadrangle":

North America
 Quadrangle (Springfield, Massachusetts), a cluster of museums and cultural institutions
 Quadrangle Dormitories (University of Pennsylvania)
 Francis Quadrangle, University of Missouri
 Memorial Quadrangle, Yale University
 Radcliffe Quadrangle (Harvard)
 Schenley Quadrangle, University of Pittsburgh
 University of Alabama Quad, University of Alabama

Europe
 Mob Quad, Merton College, Oxford
 Radcliffe Quadrangle, University College, Oxford
 Tom Quad (Great Quadrangle), Christ Church, Oxford
 Main Quad at the Main Building of University College London

Oceania
 University of Sydney Quadrangle, a sandstone building at the University of Sydney (Camperdown)

Other
Quadrangle (geography), a United States Geological Survey topographical map
Quadrangle (horse), American thoroughbred, winner of the 1964 Belmont Stakes
Quadrangle Books, an imprint of Times Books
Quadrangle Group investment fund in New York City
BDP Quadrangle (architecture firm), Toronto, Canada
Complete quadrangle (projective geometry), a configuration with four points and six lines
Love quadrangle, variant form of a love triangle, in which three people vie for the affections of a fourth
The Quadrangle (Antarctica), a glacial cirque on Alexander Island
The Quadrangle (Manhattan College), the student newspaper of Manhattan College
Quadrilateral (geometry), a four sided polygon

See also
Quad (disambiguation)
 
Siheyuan, a Chinese architectural style also known as "Chinese quadrangle"